Krishna Mishra (known as Krishna Guruji) is an Indian social activist and Yoga teacher. On International Yoga day in 2020, he organised Yoga sessions with transgender communities that are marginalised in India. Mishra has also worked to provide essential goods and beautification products to female prisoners in Indore. He performed the final rites for the remains of those people  whose ashes were unclaimed for years in Ujjain and organized webinars for disabled to connect with others, sharing experiences and motivating each other to try. Mishra writes and speaks regularly on religion, yoga, astrology and healing. He organized an all religion prayer ceremony for COVID-19 pandemic.

References 

14  https://hindi.webdunia.com/regional-hindi-news/yoga-day-with-porters-in-delhi-122062500093_1.html

15   https://www.amarujala.com/madhya-pradesh/india-independence-day-was-celebrated-with-pomp-in-america

16   https://www.etvbharat.com/hindi/madhya-pradesh/state/ujjain/ujjain-shani-temple-father-son-day-celebrate-ujjain-brahmin-son-wash-father-feet-and-worship/mp20230115175347159159374

17  https://www.amarujala.com/madhya-pradesh/indore/nris-also-deposited-funds-in-krishna-mishra-s-campaign-do-for-nation-donation-of-indore-2023-01-27

18  https://www.amarujala.com/madhya-pradesh/indore/valentine-day-guru-krishna-gave-this-special-message-to-the-youth-on-valentine-day-2023-02-14

Indian yoga teachers
Year of birth missing (living people)
Living people